Effingham is a historic home and national historic district located at Aden, Prince William County, Virginia. It was built about 1777, and is a large, two-story, five-bay, Tidewater-style, frame residence set on a raised basement.  It features a massive, exterior, brick, double chimney joined by a pent closet at each end of the structure.  Also included in the district are a brown sandstone blacksmith shop, a smokehouse and former slaves' quarters, as well as a terraced garden that is reputed to be one of the earliest in Virginia.

It was added to the National Register of Historic Places in 1989.

References

External links
Effingham, State Route 646 vicinity, Aden, Prince William County, VA: 17 photos and 3 data pages at Historic American Buildings Survey

Historic American Buildings Survey in Virginia
Houses on the National Register of Historic Places in Virginia
Historic districts on the National Register of Historic Places in Virginia
Colonial architecture in Virginia
Houses completed in 1777
Houses in Prince William County, Virginia
National Register of Historic Places in Prince William County, Virginia
Slave cabins and quarters in the United States